Richard Nevill (1743–1822) was an Irish Member of Parliament who represented Wexford in both the Parliament of Ireland and the Parliament of the United Kingdom.

He was the eldest son of Arthur Jones-Nevill, MP for Wexford Borough in the Irish Parliament, of Furness, County Kildare and was educated at Kilkenny School and Trinity College, Dublin.

On his father's death in 1771 Nevill took over the latter's Wexford seat, representing the borough until Ireland became part of the United Kingdom in 1801. He was appointed High Sheriff of Kildare for 1773–74.

He was appointed to the sinecure position of Teller of the Irish Exchequer from 1801 to 1806 and was then restored to the position from 1807 until his death.

He continued to represent Wexford Borough in the UK Parliament from 1802 to 1806, from 1807 to 1810, from 1811 to 1813 and from 1814 to 1819, alternating with other representatives on account of his age and health.

He died in 1822. He had married Bridget, the daughter and heiress of Henry Bowerman of Cooliney, co. Cork, and had 4 daughters. Furness was left to daughter Marianne, who sold it to the Beauman family.

References

1743 births
1822 deaths
People from County Kildare
Alumni of Trinity College Dublin
High Sheriffs of Kildare
Politicians from County Kildare
Members of the Parliament of Ireland (pre-1801) for County Wexford constituencies
Irish MPs 1769–1776
Irish MPs 1776–1783
Irish MPs 1783–1790
Irish MPs 1790–1797
Irish MPs 1798–1800
Members of the Parliament of the United Kingdom for County Wexford constituencies (1801–1922)
UK MPs 1802–1806
UK MPs 1807–1812
UK MPs 1812–1818
UK MPs 1818–1820